Qazi Khuda Bakhsh Morai ([Sindhi: قاضي خدابخش مورائي], 1894 - February 20, 1944) was a freedom fighter, journalist, social reformist and Lawyer of Sindh. He was an active member of the Khilafat Movement and served as the first Muslim Mayor of Karachi from 3 May 1935 to 9 May 1936. He also served as an editor of Sindhi language daily Al-Waheed.

Early life and education 
Qazi Khuda Bakhsh was born on 1 August 1894 in Moro, Naushehro Feroz District, Sindh, Bombay Presidency, British India (now Pakistan). He received early education from his father Maulvi Qazi Nabi Bakhsh Morai and then at primary school Moro. He passed matriculation examination from Sindh Maderatul Islam High School (now University) Karachi in 1914. He also studied one year at D.J. Sindh College Karachi. He earned a bachelor of arts degree from Aligarh Muslim College in 1921 and an LL.B degree from Meerut Law College in 1926.

Political career 

Bakhsh was a very talented and active student since his young age. He was a good speaker and skilled debater. During his studies at Aligarh Muslim College, he emerged out as one of the most prominent and well-known orators of the college and won two medals in the debate competitions. He was elected vice president of Aligarh Student Union in 1919.  He actively participated in the Khilafat Movement of Maulana Muhammad Ali Johar and the civil disobedience movement of Mahatma Gandhi. He served as member of the working committee of All India Congress and personal assistant to Maulana Muhammad Ali Johar. Accompanied with Maulana Johar, he addressed many gatherings of the Khilafat Movement in various cities of the British India. He also worked as secretary of the provincial Khilafat committee of Sindh and editor of daily Al-Waheed. Due to his active participation in the khilafat movement he was jailed in Karachi and Pune in 1922. During his imprisonment, he studied tafseer of the Quran from Maulana Muhammad Akram Balai.

After collapse of the Khilafat movement, he recontinued his studies and earned a law degree from Meerut Law college in 1926 and started his law practice in Karachi. He was elected unopposed as deputy mayor of Karachi in 1934 and first Muslim mayor of Karachi in 1935. As a mayor, he took numerous measures to strengthen the infrastructure of backward areas of the city. He opened many new schools and colleges including the Sindh Muslim (S.M.) college Karachi. He also upgraded the Sindh Madersatul Islam High School as a college.

He was appointed as public prosecutor of Sindh in 1943 and remained on this post until his death.

Death 
Qazi Khuda Bakhsh died on 20 February 1944 at the age of 48 years. His final resting place is Mewa Shah graveyard Karachi.

References 

1894 births
1944 deaths